Albert Mangaratua Tambunan (September 25, 1910 – December 12, 1970) was the chairman and the general secretary of the Indonesian Christian Party, and the first deputy speaker of the People's Representative Council, serving for two terms. He was also famous for being the only Christian representative in the Working Body of the Central Indonesian National Committee.

Early life 
Albert Mangaratua Tambunan was born in Tarutung, North Sumatra, Dutch East Indies on September 25, 1910. He went to the high school of law in 1940. After finishing his study, he went to work at the Jakarta High Court as a clerk, and as a judge in the Cirebon High Court.

Political career

In the Indonesian Christian Party 
Tambunan begin his career in the Indonesian legislative when he was chosen in the Working Body of the Central Indonesian National Committee as a regional delegation on 27 November 1945. He became its member until the dissolution of the committee. He went to be the deputy speaker of the People's Representative Council of the United States of Indonesia, and the Provisional People's Representative Council. In the 1955 Indonesian legislative elections, he was elected as the member of the People's Representative Council from Parkindo, representing North Sumatra electoral district.

Tambunan was chosen as the general secretary of the Indonesian Christian Party at its first congress from 6–8 December 1945 in Surakarta. He handed the position to Martinus Abendego after he was rechosen as the Central Indonesian National Committee in 1947. Seventeen years later, he was chosen as the chairman of the party at its 7th congress.

As Minister of Social Affairs 
Tambunan served as the Minister of Social Affairs for three terms, in the Ampera Cabinet, Revised Ampera Cabinet, and the First Development Cabinet. During his term, Tambunan emphasized the development of the Village Social Institution as the instrument for social development. He also proposed the creation of old-age insurance for the people of Indonesia. Tambunan went to West Germany and India, and in 1968, he attended the International Conference of Social Ministers in New York.

Family 
Tambunan had one wife and three children (two boys and a daughter).

Death 
Tambunan died at the Cendrawasih Pavilion of the Dr. Cipto Mangunkusumo Hospital. He died on 12 December 1970 at 04.15 after being treated since 2 December due to heart complications, nerve and lungs inflammation.

References

Bibliography 

1910 births
1970 deaths
Indonesian Christians
Social affairs ministers of Indonesia
People from North Tapanuli Regency
Members of the People's Representative Council, 1950
Members of the People's Representative Council, 1955